The Italian Gymnastics Federation is the national governing body for gymnastics in Italy. Founded in 1869, the federation celebrated its 150th anniversary in 2019.

International competition
The Italian Gymnastics Federation is a member of the European umbrella organization European Union of Gymnastics as well as the World Association for International Gymnastics Federation

The Italian Gymnastics Federation is the only gymnastics association part of the Italian Olympic Committee authorized to send athletes to the Olympic Games.

References

External links
 Official site

National members of the European Gymnastics
Gymnastics
Sports organizations established in 1869
Gymnastics in Italy
Organisations based in Venice
1869 establishments in Italy